The qualification competition for the 1995 FIBA Europe Under-16 Championship consisted in two different qualification rounds: the Qualifying Round and the Challenge Round. Russia, Turkey and Lithuania, as third, fourth and fifth place in the previous tournament, received a bye to the Challenge Round. Greece, as title holder, Spain, as runner-up, and Portugal, as the host, qualified directly for the tournament.

Qualifying round
Twenty-five national teams entered in this round. They were allocated in five groups of five teams each. The top three teams advanced to the Challenge Round, where they joined Russia, Turkey and Lithuania.

Teams in italics hosted the mini-tournament.

Group A
The matches were played on April 20–24, 2004.

Group B
The matches were played on April 6–10, 2004.

Group C
The matches were played on April 20–24, 2004.

Group D
The matches were played on April 20–24, 2004.

Group E
The matches were played on April 20–24, 2004.

Challenge round
The fifteen national teams entering from the Qualifying Round joined Russia, Turkey and Lithuania in this round. The eighteen teams were allocated in three groups of six teams each. The three top teams of each group advanced to the final tournament, where they joined Greece, Spain, and Portugal.

Teams in italics hosted the mini-tournament.

Group A

Group B

Group C

References
FIBA Archive
FIBA Europe Archive

1994–95 in European basketball
1995